Bay Point Farm, also known as the Bay Point Dairy Farm, the Obici House, and Sleepy Hole Golf Course, is a historic home and dairy farm located at Suffolk, Virginia. The main house is an irregularly planned Italian Renaissance style house overlooking the Nansemond River. It is a two-story, single-family dwelling, with the original section dated to about 1870. The two end blocks were added in 1925 and have hipped roofs.  Associated with the house are the garage, a silo, storage building, large farm building, and small shed. Bay Point Farm was the home of Amedeo Obici, the Planters Nut and Chocolate Company founder. Obici purchased Bay Point Farm in 1924 and remained in Suffolk at Bay Point Farm until his death in 1947.

It was added to the National Register of Historic Places in 2003.

References

Farms on the National Register of Historic Places in Virginia
Houses completed in 1925
Renaissance Revival architecture in Virginia
Houses in Suffolk, Virginia
National Register of Historic Places in Suffolk, Virginia